The 9th Vanier Cup was played on November 24, 1973, at Exhibition Stadium in Toronto, Ontario, and decided the CIAU football champion for the 1973 season. The Saint Mary's Huskies won their first ever championship by defeating the McGill Redmen by a score of 14-6.

References

External links
 Official website

Vanier Cup
Vanier Cup
1973 in Toronto
November 1973 sports events in Canada
Canadian football competitions in Toronto